There have been two baronetcies created for persons with the surname Braithwaite, both in the Baronetage of the United Kingdom. Both creations are extinct.

The Braithwaite Baronetcy, of Poston in the County of Hereford, was created in the Baronetage of the United Kingdom on 18 December 1802 for Major-General John Braithwaite. The title became extinct on the death of the second Baronet in 1809.

The Braithwaite Baronetcy, of Burnham in the County of Somerset, was created in the Baronetage of the United Kingdom on 28 January 1954 for the Conservative politician Gurney Braithwaite. The title became extinct on his death in 1958.

Braithwaite baronets, of Poston (1802)
Sir John Braithwaite, 1st Baronet (1739–1803)
Sir George Charles Braithwaite, 2nd Baronet (1762–1809)

Braithwaite baronets, of Burnham (1954)
Sir Joseph Gurney Braithwaite, 1st Baronet (1895–1958)

References

Extinct baronetcies in the Baronetage of the United Kingdom